The Poland national badminton team represents Poland in international badminton team competitions. It is managed by the Polish Badminton Association in the capital city of Warsaw. Poland competed in the Sudirman Cup from 1989 to 2011. The men's team only competed the Thomas Cup once in 2010 and the women's team have never qualified for the Uber Cup.

The men's team were runners-up at the 2010 European Men's Team Badminton Championships, where Poland was the host nation. The mixed team reached two consecutive semifinals in the European Mixed Team Badminton Championships in 2008 and 2009.

The Poland team has had many players in the past that have reached top 10 in the BWF World Ranking, one of them being Robert Mateusiak and Nadieżda Zięba, whom were the world number one mixed doubles pair in 2010.

Poland has also been successful in para-badminton. National player Bartłomiej Mróz is a four-time silver medalist at the BWF Para-Badminton World Championships and has a career-high ranking of 3 in the men's singles SU5 category.

Participation in BWF competitions

Thomas Cup 

Uber Cup

Sudirman Cup

Participation in Badminton Europe competitions

Men's Team

Women's Team 

Mixed Team

Participation in Helvetia Cup

Participation in European Junior Team Badminton Championships
Mixed Team

Notable players 

 Robert Mateusiak
 Nadieżda Zięba
 Kamila Augustyn
 Adam Cwalina
 Przemysław Wacha

 Michał Łogosz
 Adrian Dziółko
 Michał Rogalski
 Miłosz Bochat
 Agnieszka Wojtkowska

Current squad 
The following players were selected to represent the Netherlands at the 2020 European Men's and Women's Team Badminton Championships.

Male players
Michał Rogalski
Adam Cwalina
Paweł Śmiłowski
Mateusz Swierczynski
Przemysław Szydłowski
Mikołaj Szymanowski
Wiktor Trecki

Female players
Wiktoria Dąbczyńska
Magdalena Świerczyńska
Aleksandra Goszczyńska
Karolina Szubert
Joanna Podedworny
Zuzanna Jankowska

External links
  PZBad Official website

References

Badminton
National badminton teams
Badminton in Poland